Thomas Larkin Thompson (May 31, 1838 – February 1, 1898) was an American newspaperman and politician who served one term as a U.S. Representative from California from 1887 to 1889. He was the son of Robert Augustine Thompson.

Early life and career
Born in Charleston, Virginia (now West Virginia), Thompson attended the common schools and Buffalo Academy, Virginia (now West Virginia). He moved to California in 1855 and settled in Sonoma County. He established the Petaluma Journal the same year. He purchased the Sonoma Democrat in 1860, and was the editor of that paper. He served as delegate to the Democratic National Convention in 1880 and 1892, and was secretary of state of California 1883-1887. He declined to be a candidate for renomination.

Congress
Thompson was elected as a Democrat to the 50th United States Congress (March 4, 1887 – March 3, 1889). He was an unsuccessful candidate for re-election in 1888 to the 51st Congress.

Later career and death 
He was appointed on April 4, 1891, commissioner from California to the World's Fair at Chicago. He was minister to Brazil from April 24, 1893, to May 27, 1897.

Death
He died in Santa Rosa, California, February 1, 1898, and was interred in the Rural Cemetery.

References
 

1838 births
1898 deaths
Democratic Party members of the United States House of Representatives from California
19th-century American diplomats
Secretaries of State of California
Ambassadors of the United States to Brazil
19th-century American politicians
People of pre-statehood West Virginia
Politicians from Charleston, West Virginia